The Hurd Round House near Hurdsfield, North Dakota was built in 1900.

It was listed on the National Register of Historic Places in 1977.

It was a land office.  "Round" in its name is for its circular roof;  the building's walls are not round.

References

Houses on the National Register of Historic Places in North Dakota
Houses completed in 1900
Houses in Wells County, North Dakota
National Register of Historic Places in Wells County, North Dakota
Round buildings
1900 establishments in North Dakota